The 1966–67 Botola is the 11th season of the Moroccan Premier League. FAR Rabat are the holders of the title.

References

Morocco 1966–67

Botola seasons
Morocco
Botola